is a Japanese video game director and producer, best known for working on the Persona role-playing game series by Atlus. From 2006 to 2016, Hashino served as director of P-Studio, an internal team at Atlus that manages the Persona series. Following the release of Persona 5 (2016), Hashino departed P-Studio to establish Studio Zero, another development team at Atlus responsible for original projects adjacent from the Megami Tensei franchise.

Career 

Hashino made his debut as a director with the 1999 Dreamcast game, Maken X. He has directed or produced several games in the Megami Tensei and Persona series. In addition to Persona, Hashino was the director and producer on Catherine in 2011. In 2017, Hashino formed a new internal division at Atlus called Studio Zero, beginning work on a new game titled Project Re Fantasy.

Works

References 

Living people
Japanese video game producers
Japanese video game directors
Persona (series)
Year of birth missing (living people)
Place of birth missing (living people)